Reza Saffar-Harandi was an Iranian Twelver Shia Muslim who was a member of Islamic Coalition Party. He was born in 1946 in a religious family; His brother was Ali-Asqar Harandi who was a Shia cleric. Reza Saffar-Harrandi, studied at (Islamic) religious lessons to his brother after passing his primary-school. He also used to work in his brother's shop.

Saffar-Harandi had activities at his brother's mosque; and got acquainted there with Mohammad Bokharaei (the killer of Hassan Ali Mansur the prime minister of the Shah); Saffar-Harandi eventually became familiar with Islamic-Coalition-Party. This political-activist was Mohammad-Bokharaei's supporter in practice (in Mansur's assassination), and could escape from the area of the assassination, although was later arrested. Finally, he was executed by the regime of the Shah on 16 June 1965 beside his three colleagues, namely: Mohammad Bokharaei, Sadeq Amani and Morteza Niknejad, whose accusation was "participation in the assassination of Hassan Ali Mansur, the prime minister of that time".

See also 
 Fada'iyan-e Islam
 Islamic Coalition Party
 Navvab Safavi
 Mohammad Bokharaei

References 

Executed Iranian people 
Iranian prisoners sentenced to death 
Islamic Coalition Party politicians 
Iranian Islamists 
People from Tehran 
1946 births 
1965 deaths